Kamalika Guha Thakurta is an Indian television actress who hails from West Bengal. She made her debut with Mujhe Chaand Chahiye and found success with Kyunki Saas Bhi Kabhi Bahu Thi. She also played the role of Sumitra in Vishnu Puran (TV series).

In Naagin, she plays the role of Guru Maa, who lives in the Mandir, worships Ma kali, and makes plans to get rid of the Naagin (Shivanya Mother of Mahanagrani Shivangi)

She has also appeared on stage in 2014, with a part in Emotional Creature, a series of monologues written by Eve Ensler.

TV serials 

In  Mujhe Chaand Chahiye as Divya 
 In Baa Bahu aur Baby as Anish's Mom
In 
In Kyunki Saas Bhi Kabhi Bahu Thi as Gayatri Jamnadas Virani
In Vishnu Puran (TV series) as Sumitra
In Kya Hadsaa Kya Haqeeqat
In Karam Apnaa Apnaa as Devika
In Kasturi as Gayatri Dev
In Balika Vadhu as Pramila
In Yahaaan Main Ghar Ghar Kheli as Tejaswini
In Jhilmil Sitaaron Ka Aangan Hoga
In Zindagi Wins as Vandita Srinivas
 In Ek Hasina Thi (TV series) as Payal and Nitya's mom
In Maharakshak: Devi as Meena
 Jodha Akbar as Damayanti mother of Laboni
In Naagin as Guru Maa
In Sasural Simar Ka as Mahamaya "Witch"
In Yeh Rishta Kya Kehlata Hai'' as Gurumaa
In Santoshi Maa as Kamini
In Durga – Mata Ki Chhaya as Jogmaya
In Adaalat - Episode 144

References

External links
 

Indian television actresses
People from West Bengal
Living people
Year of birth missing (living people)